Mozilla Messaging (abbreviated MoMo) was a wholly owned, for-profit subsidiary of the non-profit Mozilla Foundation.  It was broadly tasked with aspects of the Mozilla Project that focused on interpersonal communications, such as instant messaging and e-mail.  Its main focus was developing Mozilla Thunderbird, the e-mail client developed by the Mozilla Foundation.

It was spun off from the Mozilla project in 2007; on 4 April 2011, it was merged into the Mozilla Labs group of the Mozilla Corporation.

References

Mozilla
Software companies of Canada
Email
2007 establishments in British Columbia

Software companies established in 2007
Canadian companies established in 2007
Canadian companies disestablished in 2011
Software companies disestablished in 2011
2011 disestablishments in British Columbia
Defunct software companies of Canada
Defunct companies of British Columbia